BB Biotech AG is a Swiss investment company in the field of biotechnology. Since 1993 it is listed on the SIX Swiss Exchange, since 1997 on the German TecDAX and since 2000 on the Italian Borsa Italiana. The company invests mainly in the United States and Western Europe. BB Biotech is managed by Bellevue Asset Management, a division of Bellevue Group and accounts for approximately 40% of the Group's assets under management.

Investment activities
As a closed-end fund, with its principal activity of specialised investments in companies operating in biotech sector, BB Biotech is the oldest-established and largest entity of its kind. 

BB Biotech's investment strategy covers a long-term time horizon and targets biotechnology firms with either already established products in the marketplace or promising drug candidates in advanced development stages. 

Aiming exclusively at human therapeutic companies, the company rules out med-tech, diagnostics and other similar activities and further concentrates on firms developing therapeutic products involving cell, gene and particularly RNA-based technologies.

In contrast to other biotech specialists or hedge funds, Biotech as a long-only investor, does not need to rely on financial instruments to reduce individual stock or market risk.

Primary geographic focus lies on small-to-mid-cap biotech companies headquartered in Western Europe or the United States market as a domicile for the majority of the world’s biotechnology companies, or those listed on Nasdaq.

While benchmarked against the Nasdaq Biotech index (in CHF), the company uses a bottom-up approach based on the fundamental analysis. Its portfolio comprises around 35 companies and includes holdings in Ionis Pharmaceuticals, Moderna, Neurocrine Biosciences, Argenx, Incyte, Vertex Pharmaceuticals, Alexion Pharmaceuticals, Arvinas, Fate Therapeutics, Agios Pharmaceuticals and Halozyme Therapeutics.

Over the decade leading to 2020, it consistently met its own aim to deliver 15% of annual growth in capital including a 5% dividend per year.

History 
BB Biotech AG mainly invests in the fields of oncology, cardiovascular diseases, metabolic diseases, infectious diseases and autoimmune diseases. 

In December 2016 the company launched BB Healthcare Trust.

Core investments
The six core investments in the BB Biotech portfolio as of June 30, 2021 included Moderna (12.2%), Ionis Pharmaceuticals (7.7%), Argenx (6.1%), Neurocrine Biosciences (6.0%), Alnylam Pharmaceuticals (4.0%), and Incyte (5.2%).

Company figures 
Company figures are as follows:

References

External links

Investment companies of Switzerland
Investment management companies of Switzerland
Companies listed on the SIX Swiss Exchange